Graminea is a genus of longhorn beetles of the subfamily Lamiinae.

 Graminea annulata Galileo & Martins, 1990
 Graminea hispida Galileo & Martins, 1990
 Graminea inca Galileo & Martins, 1990
 Graminea multicava Galileo & Martins, 1990
 Graminea rubra Martins & Galileo, 2006
 Graminea tomentosa Thomson, 1864

References

Calliini
Cerambycidae genera